Profilo Durable Household Appliances, or shortly Profilo, is a white goods and electronic products manufacturer founded in Istanbul in 1976. It is included in the BSH group.

It was founded by the famous Jewish Turkish businessman Jak Kamhi. Since 1995, it has been operating under BSH. White goods, built-in appliances, vacuum cleaners, air conditioners, water heaters and small household appliances constitute the main product network.

See also 

 BSH group

References 

Companies based in Istanbul
Turkish brands